Konstantinos Panagiotoudis (born 3 December 1994) is a Greek professional footballer who plays as a midfielder for Super League 2 club Makedonikos.

References

External links

PAOK FC official website
OnSports

Living people
1994 births
Greek footballers
Greece youth international footballers
Super League Greece players
Football League (Greece) players
Gamma Ethniki players
Super League Greece 2 players
PAOK FC players
Panionios F.C. players
Veria F.C. players
Apollon Pontou FC players
Doxa Drama F.C. players
Iraklis Thessaloniki F.C. players
AO Chania F.C. players
Makedonikos F.C. players
Association football midfielders
Footballers from Thessaloniki